En-Tact is the fourth studio album by Scottish band the Shamen, released in 1990. It was the first Shamen album to feature Mr C, and the last to feature Will Sinnott (who died on 23 May 1991). It fused the band's past psychedelic rock sounds with the rave act it became, developing a style that represented multicultural dance music.

Reception

The album was included in the book 1001 Albums You Must Hear Before You Die.

Track listing

Original UK 1990 release

US 1991 issue
The version of En-tact released in the US, and in the UK from 1991 onwards, had a different track listing:

Charts

References

1990 albums
The Shamen albums
One Little Independent Records albums